Auguste Febvrier-Despointes (1796 – 5 March 1855) was a French counter admiral. He served as the first commandant of New Caledonia from 24 September 1853 to 1 January 1854.

Life
Despointes entered the French Navy school at Brest in September 1811 and in 1844 married Anne Élisabeth Papin-Thévigné. He was promoted to commander on 10 December 1850 and contre-amiral on 2 April 1851, he became major general of the fleet at Brest and then, in 1852, rose to commander of France's naval division in Oceania and the west American coast. He officially took possession of New Caledonia in the name of France on 24 September 1853 before taking part in the far eastern theatre of the Crimean War in 1854, including the siege of Petropavlovsk. He then fell ill, dying on board his ship in 1855; his body was returned to France in 1856.

References

1796 births
1855 deaths
Martiniquais people
French Navy admirals
French military personnel of the Crimean War
Commandants of New Caledonia